Theodore Edward Hook (22 September 1788 – 24 August 1841) was an English man of letters and composer and briefly a civil servant in Mauritius. He is best known for his practical jokes, particularly the Berners Street hoax in 1809. The world's first postcard was received by Hook in 1840; he likely posted it to himself.

Biography

Early life 
Hook was born in Charlotte Street, Bedford Square, London. His father, James Hook (1746–1827), was a composer; his elder brother, also called James Hook, became Dean of Worcester.

He spent a year at Harrow School and subsequently matriculated at the University of Oxford. His father took delight in exhibiting the boy's musical and metrical gifts, and the precocious Theodore became a pet of the green room. At the age of 16, in conjunction with his father, he scored a dramatic success with The Soldier's Return, a comic opera, and it followed up with a series of popular ventures with John Liston and Charles Mathews, including Tekeli.

Hook then became a playboy and practical joker best known for the Berners Street hoax in 1810 in which he arranged for dozens of tradesmen, and notables such as the Lord Mayor of London, the Governor of the Bank of England, the Chairman of the East India Company and the Duke of Gloucester to visit Mrs Tottenham at 54 Berners Street to win a bet that he could transform any house in London into the most talked-about address within a week.

Career 
He took up residence at St Mary Hall, Oxford University, leaving after two terms to resume his former life. His gift of improvising songs charmed the Prince Regent into a declaration that something must be done for Hook, who was appointed accountant-general and treasurer of Mauritius with a salary of £2,000 a year (£142,325; US$194,771 in 2021 terms). He was the life and soul of the island from his arrival in October 1813, but a serious deficiency was discovered in the treasury accounts in 1817, and he was arrested and brought to England on a criminal charge. A sum of about £12,000 (£1,054,500; US$1.44 million in 2021 terms) had been extracted by a deputy official, and Hook was held responsible.

During the scrutiny of the audit board, he lived obscurely and maintained himself by writing for magazines and newspapers. In 1820, he launched the newspaper John Bull, the champion of high Toryism and the virulent detractor of Queen Caroline. Witty criticism and pitiless invective secured it a large circulation, and Hook derived, for the first year at least, an income of £2,000. He was, however, arrested for the second time on account of his debt to the state, which he made no effort to defray.

While he was confined in a sponging-house from 1823 to 1825, he wrote the nine volumes of stories afterwards collected under the title of Sayings and Doings (1824–1828). In the early 1820s, he helped the singer Michael Kelly compile his Reminiscences, which include details of working with Mozart. In the remaining 23 years of his life, he poured forth 38 volumes besides articles, squibs and sketches. His novels have frequent passages of racy narrative and vivid portraiture. They include Maxwell (1830), a portrait of his friend the Reverend E. Cannon; Love and Pride (1833); the autobiographical Gilbert Gurney (1835) and Gurney Married (1838); Jack Brag (1837) and Peregrine Bunce (1842). He did not finish a biographical work on Charles Mathews. His last novel was Births, Marriages and Deaths (1839).

The world's oldest postcard was sent to Hook in 1840, bearing a penny black stamp. Hook probably created and posted the card to himself as a practical joke on the postal service, since the image is a caricature of workers in the post office. In 2002, the postcard sold for a record £31,750.

Later life and death 
Work had already begun to tell on his health when Hook returned to his old habits and a prolonged attempt to combine industry and dissipation resulted in the confession that he was done up in purse, in mind and in body, too, at last. He died at home in Fulham on 24 August 1841. His estate was seized by the Treasury. He never married but lived with Mary Anne Doughty; they had six children.

Hook is remembered as one of the most brilliant figures of Georgian times. He inspired the characters of Lucian Gay in Benjamin Disraeli's novel Coningsby and Mr Wagg in Thackeray's Vanity Fair. His style was parodied by the Smith brothers in Rejected Addresses (1812). Coleridge praised him as being "as true a genius as Dante".

Notes

References
 Richard Harris Barham, Life and Remains of Hook (3rd ed, 1877).
 John Gibson Lockhart, Review of Peregrine Bunce, Quarterly Review (May 1843), 53-108. Includes biographical sketch of Hook.
 Bill Newton Dunn, The Man Who Was John Bull (1996 but still in print), Allendale Publishing, 29 Old Palace Lane, Richmond TW9 1PQ, GB
 Graeme Harper, 'Hook, Theodore Edward (1788–1841)’, Oxford Dictionary of National Biography, Oxford University Press, 2004; online edition, January 2008 Retrieved 17 September 2012

Attribution

External links
 

English writers
1788 births
1841 deaths
People educated at Harrow School
Alumni of St Mary Hall, Oxford
Mauritian civil servants
British Mauritius people